Karataş Şahinbey Sport Hall is an indoor multi-purpose sport venue that is located in the Gaziantep, Turkey. Opened in 2010, the hall has a seating capacity of 6,400 spectators. It is home to Gaziantep Basketbol, which plays currently in the Turkish Basketball League.

It was the venue for the 2014-15 Turkish Cup Basketball play-offs.

References

Sports venues completed in 2010
Indoor arenas in Turkey
Basketball venues in Turkey
Turkish Basketball League venues